A billao, also known as a belawa, is a horn-hilted Somali shortsword or long dagger depending on blade length. It served most notably as a close-quarters weapon in the Dervish State, at the turn of the 20th century.

Features
The billao has a double-edged, leaf-shaped, asymmetrical blade and a three-pronged pommel. One-pronged pommels with the metal tang protruding out from the center of the hilt have been reported. Together, the grip and pommel are 6¾" in circumference. The billao's blade is made of iron or steel, and is 10½" long and 2½" wide. Though other horn types are also used, the handle is typically made from the horn of buffalo. In total, the dagger is 17¼" long. The sheath is made of sheepskin, and the sword is worn on a belt around the waist.

It is said to have originated in the Togdheer, Cayn and Sool occupied regions of present-day Somaliland

See also
List of swords

References

External links
 Somali warrior

Blade weapons
African swords
Weapons of Somalia
Somali culture